East Park is a major park of about  situated on the Holderness Road in Hull, East Riding of Yorkshire, England. East Park is registered a Grade II listed site by English Heritage. It is the largest public park in Hull and is often used for large open-air venues such as concerts and the annual Hull Show.

History
East Park first opened to the public on 21 June 1887—the day the country celebrated Queen Victoria's Golden Jubilee. About 20 years earlier, in the west of the city, Zachariah Pearson had established Hull's first public park, which was initially known as The People's Park and later simply as Pearson Park. Then, in 1882, with Pearson Park established in the west, the Parks Committee began to look at possible locations for a park in the east. They eventually decided on a site close to the terminus of the horse-drawn tramway which ran along Holderness Road, and they agreed to pay £16,909 7s 6d to Mrs Anne Watston's Trust for 38 acres 2 roods and 24 perches of her land (approx. 15 ha). An insight into how East Park's Victorian founders came to choose its site, and into their hopes for the role it might play within the community, is found in the accountant's report of 1883.

"...A more picturesque locality of that extent it would be impossible find on the East side of the Borough or one more adapted to restore the jaded energies of the artisan or man of business when the labours of the day are ended.".

Work was soon under way to construct the city's new green space, and by 1886 the project was providing 140 much needed jobs in a time of high unemployment, with the possibility that the total figure might climb as high as 200. Most of the men were earning up to 18s a week but around ten were paid a couple of shillings more. When Jubilee Day arrived the following summer, large crowds lined the route of a parade which marched from the city centre, where a new covered market was officially opened, along Lowgate, Whitefriargate, and Holderness Road to its end point in the new park. There is no record of any official decision to adopt the name East Park, and at the opening ceremony Alderman W.F.Chapman suggested that it should be called Victoria Park. However, East Park it remained, and as local historian Mary Fowler remarks "...with the economy of expression so common in these parts, East Park is, as often as not, just 'Park' to the people of East Hull.".

From the beginning East Park and its counterpart in the west were focal points for many kinds of recreational activity. East Park did not offer the archery and quoits available in Pearson Park, but football, cricket, tennis and bowls were popular. The Model Yacht Pond had its own Yacht House  and a flagpole for team colours. Enthusiasts could read about competitions involving the tiny craft in the local newspaper:  an edition in June 1912, for example, revealed that the boats had to contend with "a light northerly breeze, the course being a beat to windward.". Concerts in both parks drew large audiences: a performance in Pearson Park, one Friday evening in July 1901, entertained 15,000 spectators.

The popularity of East Park kept the authorities busy. When The Shop Assistants Union complained that its late-working members were unable to attend the concerts, and so "girls of 13 and 14 years never have a chance to hear the music", they found a champion in Hull Daily Mail columnist "Mother Humber", who wanted the concerts moved to Thursday, which was early-closing day. Footballers' poor behaviour and swearing were cause for concern for the Parks Superintendent, but the cricketers and the model-boaters appear to have escaped his disapprobation. Bowls, like tennis, required careful handling when assessing the competing claims of the general public and organised teams, all of whom wanted access to the facilities during the few short hours "when the labours of the day are ended".

Before 1930 the park gradually expanded eastwards to occupy a triangular area of land more or less equivalent with its present-day boundaries. The new land, bounded on the north by the Summergangs Dyke and Holderness Road on the south, took in the George V Playing Fields and a series of old clay pits. Surviving park features from the era include the Ferens boating lake which was established on land donated by T.R. Ferens in 1913 and extended in 1923, a double arched bridge with decorative balustrades built around 1925, and a rare water chute ride – known locally as the "Splash Boat" – which is Grade II listed.

A £10.3 million refurbishment on site has returned the East Park recreational area to its former condition. New visitor attractions include a giant walk-through aviary, an animal education centre, a boat house and a community pavilion. The Victorian Khyber Pass, Splash Boat, original maze and the Valley Ornamental Gardens have been restored. In addition, special help points have been installed so that visitors can call for a park ranger or first aid.

The Heritage Lottery Fund contributed £6.4 million to the refurbishment project, which was completed in 2008.

The Splash Boat, designed by the engineer Charles Wicksteed, was constructed in 1929, and was Grade II listed in 2003. It  underwent a £35,000 restoration in 2012. The only other surviving example of a Wicksteed water chute is at Wicksteed Park, erroneously described in the latter's publicity as "unique," despite the continued operation of the one in Hull.

In late 2015 planning permission was sought and granted by the council to extend the car park of the adjacent Woodford Leisure Centre into the park removing a large amount of green space. This was despite the objections of residents and of some council departments notably those responsible for wildlife and green spaces.

A new memorial to Mick Ronson was unveiled on 2 June 2017 in the park.

Notes

Bibliography

External links

East Park - Hull City Council

Parks and open spaces in Kingston upon Hull
1887 establishments in England
Articles containing video clips